Heroes Die is a science fantasy novel by American writer Matthew Stover, the first of a series of novels featuring the protagonist Caine.

Plot
The novels are set in a future dystopia Earth where a parallel world called Overworld reminiscent of the worlds featured in post-Tolkien secondary world fantasy has been discovered. The corporations that run Earth send actors into Overworld in order to provide the masses of an overcrowded world with virtual-reality entertainment.

Hari Michaelson is a famous Actor and son of a now-mentally ill libertarian professor. On Overworld, he is the assassin Caine, while his estranged wife Shanna is another Actor, playing the mage Pallas Ril. Actors who travel to Overworld through advanced technology and assume an alternate persona which they then use to carry out 'adventures'. Pallas is captured by Ma'elKoth, the Emperor of Overworld's human kingdom of Ankhana, on one of her adventures. Ma'elKoth's plan to rule Ankhana by wiping out a final resistance group is blocked by a spell that causes others to forget the existence of the resistance group's members. The remainder of the book plays out the conflict between Ma'elKoth, Caine and the resistance. Hari finds himself manipulated by both the powers on Overworld and the Studio on Earth, and must defeat them both in order to save himself and Pallas Ril from death.

Major themes
Heroes Die contains moral questions the author does not believe typically arise in fantasy. In a 1999 interview regarding the novel, Stover describes it as follows:

"It's a piece of violent entertainment that's a meditation on violent entertainment- as a concept in itself, as a cultural obsession.  It's a love story: romantic love, paternal love, repressed homoerotic love, love of money, of power, of country, love betrayed and employed as both carrot and stick.  It's about all different kinds of heroes and all the different ways they die."

Violence
Earth is overcrowded and oppressed, with a caste-based dystopian government; the masses turning to the adventures of the Actors such as Caine for entertainment and distraction.  The violence within the Acts of Caine is often portrayed in graphic detail because that is what the viewers on Earth are seeking.  Michaelson, in the character of Caine, exhibits willingness to sacrifice the citizens of Ankhana and even his friends in order to save his wife.  Hari's father is a former libertarian academic who provides a counterpoint to the violence and despair of Earth.

Style 
As with its sequel, Heroes Die utilizes multiple point of view; a number of characters including Hari, Shanna, and Berne are used as third-person narrators for various parts of the story.  However, for the scenes from Hari's perspective when he is on Overworld as Caine, the sections are portrayed from a first-person viewpoint and are meant to be Caine's interior soliloquies he runs for the benefit of the audiences on Earth; toward the end of the novel he addresses the audience directly.  These segments tend to be more in plain speech, more peppered with profanity, shorter paragraphs, and tangents that follow Caine's train of thought.

Influences 
Caine mentions the book The Moon is a Harsh Mistress as the source of Pallas Rill's pseudonym, Simon Jester.

Footnotes

External links

 Excerpt

American science fiction novels
1998 American novels
1998 science fiction novels
American fantasy novels
Del Rey books
Dystopian novels
Novels about virtual reality
Science fantasy novels
Overpopulation fiction